Köprüağzı station is a train station in Turkey.It is located at  in Türkoğlu ilçe (district) of Kahramanmaraş Province. It is a junction point of the main east to west railway and a spur line to Kahramanmaraş . In addition to freight trains main passenger train is Fırat Express (Adana-Elazığ) train.

References

Railway stations in Kahramanmaraş Province
Buildings and structures in Kahramanmaraş Province
Transport in Kahramanmaraş Province